Gullträsk is a hamlet located in Boden Municipality.

References

Populated places in Norrbotten County